The Soviet Top League, known after 1970 as the Higher League, served as the top division (tier) of Soviet Union football from 1936 until 1991. The league's name was a conditional designation used for brevity since being completely owned and governed by the Football Federation of the Soviet Union. The full official name was USSR Championship in football: Top League. An attempt to create fully professional league as autonomously governed organization during "perestroika" period was denied by Federation due to political culture in the Soviet Union.

The professional top level of football competition among clubs was established in 1936 on proposition of Nikolai Starostin and was approved by the All-Union Council of Physical Culture. Originally it was named Group A.  After World War II it became known as the First Group. In 1950, after another reform of football in the Soviet Union, the First Group was replaced with Class A. By 1970, the Class A had expanded to three tiers with the top tier known as the Higher Group which in 1971 was renamed into the Higher League.

After the World War II, along with the competition among the first teams also there were conducted official competitions among reserve squads. It carried the name of "Tournament of Doubles" (Turnir doublyorov). The reserve squads' competitions were running parallel to the first teams' competitions normally scheduled a day prior with relegation rule completely depended on the league standing of their respective first team.

The Top League was one of the best football leagues in Europe, ranking second among the UEFA members in 1988–89 seasons. Three of its representatives reached the finals of the European club tournaments on four occasions: FC Dynamo Kyiv, FC Dinamo Tbilisi, and FC Dynamo Moscow. In the same way that the international community widely considers Russia to be the political successor state to the Soviet Union, UEFA considers the Russian Premier League to have succeeded the Soviet Top League.

Overview

Introduction and popularization
The league was established on the initiative of head of Spartak sport society, Nikolai Starostin. Starostin proposed to create eight professional club teams in six Soviet cities and hold two championship tournaments per calendar year. With minor corrections, the Soviet Council on Physical Culture accepted the Starostin's proposal creating a league of "demonstration teams of master" which were sponsored by sport societies and factories. Nikolai Starostin de facto became a godfather of the Soviet championships. Numerous mass events took place to promote the newly established competition, among which there was an introduction of football exhibition game as part of the Moscow Physical Culture Day parade, invitation of football team from Basque region which was on the side supported by Soviet Union in the Spanish Civil War and others.

In 1936 the first secretary of Komsomol Kosarev came up with an idea of playing an actual football game at the Red Square as part of the Physical Culture Day parade. Stalin never attended any sports events, but the Physical Culture Day was an exclusion to the rule. The 1936 Physical Culture Day parade was directed by Russian theatre director Valentin Pluchek. For the football game, a giant green felt carpet was sewn by Spartak athletes and laid down on the Red Square's cobblestones. A night before the parade, the rug was stitched together in sections, rolled up and then stored in a vestibule of the GUM department store located at the square. Following the 1936 Red Square game, it became a tradition before the World War II and part of the Physical Culture Day parade event.

In the late 1930s Spartak was giving out thousands of tickets per game to members of the Central Committee of the All-Union Communist Party (Bolsheviks). Among serious football fans was Lavrentiy Beria who proposed to have one team from each of union republics in the league. In July 1937 a conflict erupted following a successful tour to the Soviet Union of a football team from Basque region during which the main governing body of sports in the country, the All-Union Council of Physical Culture, was accused by the party and Komsomol for failing the sports policy. Spartak's leadership and Starostin in particular were accused of corruption and implementing "bourgeoisie methods" in Soviet sport.

The most prominent clubs of the league were FC Dynamo Kyiv, FC Spartak Moscow, and FC Dynamo Moscow. The most popular clubs besides the above-mentioned were PFC CSKA Moscow, FC Ararat Yerevan, and FC Dinamo Tbilisi. Dinamo Tbilisi became famous for finishing third but never winning the title, the first title they won in 1964.

Development
Until the 1960s the main title contenders in the league were the Moscow clubs of Spartak and Dynamo whose dominance was disrupted for only a brief period after World War II by CSKA Moscow, nicknamed 'The team of lieutenants'. The first team that won 10 championships was Dynamo Moscow in 1963, followed by Spartak in 1979.

Eleven clubs spent over 30 seasons in the league with five of them from Moscow. Dynamo Moscow and Dynamo Kyiv were the only clubs that participated in all seasons of the league. Among other prominent Russian clubs were SKA Rostov/Donu (Army team), Zenit Leningrad (Zenith), and Krylia Sovietov Kuibyshev (Wings of the Soviets).

Over the years the league changed, however from the 1970s its competition structure solidified with 16 participants, except from 1979 through 1985 when the number of participants was extended to 18.

One uniquely Soviet innovation around this time was the "draw limit", whereby a team would receive zero points for any draws in excess of a fixed number, first 8, then 10. This rule had consequences for both the title race and relegation while it was in place. A 1973 experiment to resolve drawn games by penalty shoot-out lasted only one season.

Dynamo Kyiv's success as a Ukrainian club was supplemented in the 1980s with the appearance of Dnipro Dnipropetrovsk led by its striker Oleh Protasov who set a new record for goals scored in a season. In 1984, Zenit Leningrad became Soviet champions for the first time.

With the unravelling of the Soviet Union in the late 1980s, the structure of the league also became unstable as more and more clubs lost interest in continuing to participate in the league, prompting several rounds of reorganisation. The main effect of these was to boost the numbers of Ukrainian clubs to be on par with the Russians.

Since the fall of the Soviet Union, it has been suggested that the competition be re-established along the lines of the Commonwealth of Independent States Cup, but due to a lack of interest on various levels the venture has never been implemented.

Participants 
Contrary to popular belief, Russian clubs were never a majority in the Top League, nor did they enjoy any special status. However, the uneven population of the Soviet Union meant that the participants in a typical Top League season fell into three blocs:

 Russian clubs. Russian football was dominated by the "four-wheeled cart" of Moscow clubs: Spartak (Komsomol), Dynamo (police), CSKA (army) and Torpedo (auto workers). These four were often joined in the Top League by Lokomotiv (railroad workers), Zenit Leningrad (defense industry workers), or assorted clubs from smaller cities.
 Ukrainian clubs. Ukraine's capital Kyiv, by contrast, was the exclusive province of FC Dynamo Kyiv who became an unofficial feeder for the Soviet national team beginning in the 1960s, replacing Dynamo Moscow. Several clubs vied to be Ukraine's "second" team over the years including Shakhtar Donetsk, Metalist Kharkiv, Chernomorets Odessa, Zorya Voroshilovgrad (now Zorya Luhansk) and Dnipro Dnipropetrovsk, the last two managing to win one title apiece. Many Ukrainian clubs also were associated with the Soviet Dynamo sports society.
 Other repbublics clubs. Lavrentiy Beria's vision of one representative club per republic was partly realised from the 1950s onwards, as in every republic except for Russia and Ukraine, fan interest and government support became concentrated into a single club based in the republic's capital city, who became "the republic's team". Most of those clubs were originally created as Spartak or Dynamo, supported either by local party committee (Spartak) or local KGB office (Dynamo). Thus Lithuania became represented by Zalgiris Vilnius, Latvia by Daugava Riga, Estonia by Kalev Tallinn, Byelorussia by Dinamo Minsk, Moldavia by Nistru Kishinev, Armenia by Ararat Yerevan, Azerbaijan by Neftchi Baku, Georgia by Dinamo Tbilisi, Kazakhstan by Kairat Alma-Ata, Uzbekistan by Pakhtakor Tashkent and Tajikistan by Pamir Dushanbe. A typical Top League season would feature 4-6 of these eleven, and Yerevan, Minsk and Tbilisi all managed to win the title at least once. Only Georgia, with Torpedo Kutaisi and later Guria Lanchkhuti, was ever able to have a second representative survive in the Top League in addition to their capital city club. (Turkmenistan and Kirghizia were represented in the Soviet football pyramid by Köpetdag Aşgabat and Alga Frunze respectively, but neither reached the top level.)

Documentation
Documentation about the league is scarce. Among well-known researchers are Aksel Vartanyan for Sport Express, Andrei Moroz and Georgiy Ibragimov for KLISF Club, Alexandru G.Paloşanu, Eugene Berkovich, Mike Dryomin, Almantas Lauzadis, and Hans Schöggl for RSSSF Archives. Another extensive databases are composed at helmsoccer.narod.ru and FC Dynamo Moscow website.

Names
Since its creation, the Soviet Top League's name changed a quite few times:

1936 – 1941 Group A (Группа А)
Prior to World War II the championship was split into several groups usually of eight teams and named by the letters of the Cyrillic script.
1945 – 1949 The First Group of USSR (Первая группа СССР)
Upon the reestablishment of the league after the war for several years it was numbered sequentially with the top league being the First.
1950 – 1962 Class "A" of USSR (Класс "А" СССР)
Since 1950, the alphabetical classification of the Soviet league hierarchy has resumed. In 1960 through 1962 the league consisted of two groups with the better clubs qualified for the championship pool and less fortunate – the relegation pool.
1963 – 1969 The First Group "A" of USSR (Первая группа "А" СССР)

European representation
The first time the Soviet League was represented in Europe in the 1965–66 European Cup Winners' Cup by Dynamo Kyiv. In its first year the club reached the quarterfinals, eliminating on its way Coleraine and Rosenborg and winning all four matches with those clubs. The Ukrainians also knocked out reigning champions Celtic in the first round in the 1967–68 European Cup. In the 1968–69 season the Soviet clubs withdrew from continental competitions after the invasion of Czechoslovakia. From 1974 (except for the 1982–83 season) to 1984 the league was among the best 10 national competitions in the UEFA rankings (based on continental competitions performance) reaching the 4th place in 1976 and 1977.  From 1985 the Soviet Top League was among the best four in Europe, until the collapse of the Soviet Union in 1991.

In 1987 and 1988 the Soviet Top League was the second best league in Europe, however by the end of the Soviet Union the results of its representatives worsened as top players could now leave and play for foreign leagues in the West. The very last coefficient position that the Soviet League placed was No. 9 in 1992. The 1992/93 season all the results of the Soviet League were transferred to the Russian Premier League. Throughout its history the representatives of the league on four occasions made to the finals of the three primary European competitions being victorious in three. Once a Soviet club was able to win the UEFA Super Cup.

Football championship among city teams (1923–1935)
Before establishment of professional competitions among clubs, in the Soviet Union existed another competition that was conducted among collective teams of various cities or republics.

Champions and top goalscorers

Bold text in the "Champion" column denotes that the club also won the Soviet Cup during the same season. The italicized text in the table indicates the other cup champions that made it the Soviet top-3.

Group A

Performance by club

First group

Performance by club

Class A

Performance by club

Class A (1st Group)

Class A (Top Group)

Top League

Overall statistics

Performance by club's first teams

Performance by republic

The republics that were never represented at the top level were the Turkmen SSR and the Kyrgyz SSR. Also, in Soviet football Russian SFSR teams were represented by three different entities with Moscow and Leningrad as the Union federal cities teams considered separately from rest of Russian teams. Thus, the all-time best performing team from Russian SFSR was SKA Rostov-na-Donu.

All-time table

1Two points for a win. In 1973, a point for a draw was awarded only to a team that won the subsequent penalty shootout. In 1978–1988, the number of draws for which points were awarded was limited.

Best coaches

Notes:
 Clubs are shown those with which the listed coaches made the top-3, i.e. Beskov won two Top league titles and all with Spartak, but he also managed Dynamo with which he was a league runner-up.

Awards and prizes 

Starting since 1958 beside medals of the regular Soviet championship, participants were awarded number of prizes (~ 18 regular prizes) that were established by various sports and public organizations, editorial offices of newspapers and magazines.

Soviet football championship among reserves

Footnotes

References

External links

USSR (Soviet Union) – Final Tables, rsssf.com. Retrieved 9 June 2006.
Russian Portal about Soviet Football, sovfootball.ru.
USSR&Russian soccers tables
An extensive database of game protocols and statistics 
 Media Biblioteca of the Soviets Football
 Media Biblioteca of the Soviets Football in VK

 
Soviet Union
1
Top League
1991 disestablishments in the Soviet Union